Álvaro Rodríguez may refer to:

 Álvaro Rodríguez (nobleman) (1129-1167), Galician magnate and nobleman
 Álvaro Rodríguez (footballer, 1936–2018), Spanish football defender and manager
 Álvaro Rodríguez Echeverría (born 1942), Costa Rican priest
 Álvaro Rodríguez (athlete) (born 1987), Spanish middle-distance runner
 Álvaro Rodríguez (footballer, born 1994), Spanish football right-back for Burgos
 Álvaro Rodríguez (footballer, born 2004), Spanish football forward for Real Madrid Castilla

See also
 Alvaro Rodrigues (born 1993), Brazilian football midfielder for Confiança